Shuangfengqiao station may refer to:
Shuangfengqiao station (Chengdu Metro)
Shuangfengqiao station (Chongqing Rail Transit)